Wang Lü (1332–?) was a Chinese landscape painter, calligrapher, poet and physician who was active during the Ming Dynasty (1368–1644). His specific date of death is unknown.

Wang was born in Kunshan in the Jiangsu province. His style name was 'Andao' (安道 Āndào "peaceful way/path") and his sobriquets were 'Jisou and Baodu laoren' (畸叟 jī sǒu "odd old gentleman", and 抱獨老人/抱独老人 bào dú lào rén "old man embraced by solitude"). Wang's painting followed the style of Xia Gui. Some of his works included:
 Album Leaf Paintings of HuaShan
 Shu Hui Album - twenty-one pieces
 Yi Yun Tong - one hundred volumes

References

1332 births
Ming dynasty landscape painters
Year of death unknown
Ming dynasty calligraphers
Ming dynasty poets
14th-century Chinese physicians
Painters from Suzhou
Writers from Suzhou
Poets from Jiangsu
14th-century Chinese calligraphers
Physicians from Jiangsu
Chinese non-fiction writers